The 2011 Atlantic hurricane season was an event in the annual hurricane season in the north Atlantic Ocean. It was well above average, with 19 tropical storms forming. Even so, it was the first season on record in which the first eight storms failed to attain hurricane strength. The season officially began on June 1, 2011, and ended on November 30, 2011, dates that conventionally delimit the period of each year when most tropical cyclones develop in the Atlantic basin. The season's first storm, Tropical Storm Arlene did not form until June 28. The final storm to develop, Tropical Storm Sean, dissipated on November 11.

There were 19 named storms altogether during the season, including seven hurricanes of which three intensified into major hurricanes. The two most significant storms, in terms of loss of life and damage, were Hurricane Irene and Tropical Storm Lee. Tropical Storm Lee was a disorganized tropical cyclone that moved ashore into Louisiana before producing historic flooding in the Northeast United States as an extratropical cyclone.

This timeline includes information that was not operationally released, meaning that data from post-storm reviews by the National Hurricane Center, such as a storm that was not operationally warned upon, has been included. This timeline documents tropical cyclone formations, strengthening, weakening, landfalls, extratropical transitions, and dissipations during the season.

By convention, meteorologists use one time zone when issuing forecasts and making observations: Coordinated Universal Time (UTC), and also use the 24-hour clock (where 00:00 = midnight UTC). The National Hurricane Center uses both UTC and the time zone where the center of the tropical cyclone is currently located. The time zones utilized (east to west) prior to 2020 were: Atlantic, Eastern, and Central. In this timeline, all information is listed by UTC first with the respective regional time included in parentheses. Additionally, figures for maximum sustained winds and position estimates are rounded to the nearest 5 units (knots, miles, or kilometers), following the convention used in the National Hurricane Center's products. Direct wind observations are rounded to the nearest whole number. Atmospheric pressures are listed to the nearest millibar and nearest hundredth of an inch of mercury.

Timeline

June

June 1
The 2011 Atlantic hurricane season officially begins. 
June 28
1800 UTC (1:00 p.m.
June 30
1200 UTC (7:00 a.m. CDT) – Tropical Storm Arlene reaches its peak intensity with winds of 65 mph (100 km/h) and a minimum barometric pressure of 993 mbar (hPa). 
1300 UTC (8:00 a.m.

July
July 1
0000 UTC (7:00 p.m. CDT June 30) – Tropical Storm Arlene weakens to a tropical depression.
0600 UTC (1:00 a.m. CDT) – Tropical Depression Arlene dissipates over the high terrain of Mexico.
July 17
1800 UTC (2:00 p.m.
July 18
0000 UTC (8:00 p.m. EDT July 17) – Tropical Depression Two intensifies into Tropical Storm Bret.
1800 UTC (2:00 p.m.
July 20

0600 UTC (2:00 a.m.
1200 UTC (8:00 a.m. AST) - Tropical Depression Three intensifies into Tropical Storm Cindy.
July 21
1800 UTC (2:00 p.m.
July 22
0000 UTC (8:00 p.m. AST July 21) – Tropical Storm Bret weakens to a tropical depression northwest of Bermuda.
1200 UTC (8:00 a.m.
July 23
0000 UTC (8:00 p.m.
July 27
0600 UTC (1:00 a.m.
1800 UTC (1:00 p.m.
July 29
0000 UTC (7:00 p.m.
July 30
0230 UTC (9:30 p.m.
0600 UTC (1:00 a.m. CDT) – Tropical Depression Don degenerates into a remnant low over southeast Texas.

August
August 2
 0000 UTC (8:00 p.m.

August 3
 0600 UTC (2:00 a.m. AST) – Tropical Storm Emily reaches its peak intensity with winds of 50 mph (85 km) and a minimum barometric pressure of 1003 mbar (hPa).
August 4
 1800 UTC (2:00 p.m. EDT) – Tropical Storm Emily degenerates into an open tropical wave south of Haiti. 
August 6
 1800 UTC (2:00 p.m. EDT) – The remnants of Tropical Storm Emily regenerate into Tropical Depression Emily.
August 7
 0000 UTC (8:00 p.m. EDT August 6) – Tropical Depression Emily regains tropical storm status north of Grand Bahama.
 1200 UTC (8:00 a.m. EDT) – Tropical Storm Emily degenerates into a non-convective remnant area of low pressure.
August 12
 1800 UTC (2:00 p.m.
August 13
 0600 UTC (2:00 a.m.
 1200 UTC (8:00 a.m.
 1800 UTC (2:00 p.m.
 1800 UTC (2:00 p.m. AST) – Tropical Storm Franklin transitions into an extratropical cyclone.

August 14
 0600 UTC (2:00 a.m. AST) – Tropical Depression Seven intensifies into Tropical Storm Gert.
August 15
 1200 UTC (8:00 a.m.
August 16
 1200 UTC (8:00 a.m. AST) – Tropical Storm Gert degenerates into a non-convective remnant area of low pressure.
August 19
 0000 UTC (8:00 p.m.
 1200 UTC (8:00 a.m. EDT) – Tropical Depression Eight intensifies into Tropical Storm Harvey.
August 20
 0600 UTC (2:00 a.m. EDT) – Tropical Storm Harvey reaches its peak intensity with a minimum barometric pressure of 994 mbar (hPa).
 1730 UTC (12:30 p.m.
August 21
 0000 UTC (8:00 p.m.
 0600 UTC (1:00 a.m. CDT) – Tropical Storm Harvey weakens to a tropical depression.
 2300 UTC (7:00 p.m.

August 22
 0000 UTC (7:00 p.m. CDT August 21) – Tropical Depression Harvey regains tropical storm status in the Bay of Campeche.
 0200 UTC (9:00 p.m.
 0525 UTC (1:25 a.m.
 0600 UTC (1:00 a.m. CDT) – Tropical Storm Harvey weakens to a tropical depression.
 0600 UTC (2:00 a.m. AST) – Tropical Storm Irene intensifies into a Category 1 hurricane on the Saffir–Simpson hurricane scale, becoming the first hurricane of the 2011 season.
 1800 UTC (1:00 p.m.
August 24
 0600 UTC (2:00 a.m. AST) – Hurricane Irene intensifies into a Category 2 hurricane north of Haiti.
 1200 UTC (8:00 a.m.
 1600 UTC (12:00 p.m.
August 25
 0000 UTC (8:00 p.m.
 0000 UTC (8:00 p.m.
 0900 UTC (5:00 a.m.
 1800 UTC (2:00 p.m.
August 26
 0600 UTC (2:00 a.m. EDT) – Hurricane Irene reaches its peak intensity with a minimum barometric pressure of 942 mbar (hPa).
 1800 UTC (2:00 p.m. EDT) – Hurricane Irene weakens to a Category 1 hurricane.

August 27
 0000 UTC (8:00 p.m. AST August 26) – Tropical Depression Ten degenerates into a non-convective remnant area of low pressure.
 0600 UTC (2:00 a.m.
 1200 UTC (8:00 a.m.
 1200 UTC (8:00 a.m. AST) – Tropical Depression Eleven intensifies into Tropical Storm Jose.
August 28
 0935 UTC (5:35 a.m.
 1200 UTC (8:00 a.m.
 1300 UTC (9:00 a.m.
August 29
 0000 UTC (8:00 p.m. EDT August 28) – Tropical Storm Irene transitions into an extratropical cyclone near the Vermont–New Hampshire border.
 0000 UTC (8:00 p.m.
 0600 UTC (2:00 a.m.
August 30

September
September 1
 0000 UTC (8:00 p.m.
 0000 UTC (8:00 p.m.
 1200 UTC (8:00 a.m. EDT) – The tropical depression intensifies into an unnamed tropical storm.
September 2
 0000 UTC (7:00 p.m.
 0600 UTC (2:00 a.m.
 1200 UTC (7:00 a.m. CDT) – Tropical Depression Thirteen intensifies into Tropical Storm Lee.

September 3
 0000 UTC (8:00 p.m.
 1200 UTC (7:00 a.m.
September 4
 0600 UTC (1:00 a.m. CDT) – Subtropical Storm Lee reaches its peak intensity with a minimum barometric pressure of 986 mbar (hPa).
 1030 UTC (5:30 a.m.
 1200 UTC (8:00 a.m. AST) – Hurricane Katia intensifies into a Category 2 hurricane.
September 5
 0600 UTC (1:00 a.m. CDT) – Subtropical Storm Lee transitions into an extratropical cyclone over east-central Louisiana.
 1200 UTC (8:00 a.m. AST) – Hurricane Katia intensifies into a Category 3 hurricane.
September 6
 0000 UTC (8:00 p.m.
 1200 UTC (8:00 a.m. AST) – Hurricane Katia weakens to a Category 3 hurricane.
 1800 UTC (2:00 p.m. AST) – Hurricane Katia weakens to a Category 2 hurricane.
 1800 UTC (2:00 p.m.
September 7
 0000 UTC (8:00 p.m. AST September 6) – Tropical Depression Fourteen intensifies into Tropical Storm Maria.
 1200 UTC (8:00 a.m. AST) – Hurricane Katia weakens to a Category 1 hurricane.
 1800 UTC (1:00 p.m.

September 8
 1800 UTC (1:00 p.m.
September 9
 0000 UTC (7:00 p.m.
 0600 UTC (1:00 a.m. CDT) – Hurricane Nate weakens to a tropical storm.
 1200 UTC (8:00 a.m. AST) – Tropical Storm Maria degenerates into a tropical disturbance.
September 10
 1200 UTC (8:00 a.m.
 1200 UTC (8:00 a.m.
September 11
 1600 UTC (11:00 a.m.
September 12
 0000 UTC (1:00 a.m.
 September 15
 1800 UTC (2:00 p.m. EDT) – Tropical Storm Maria intensifies into a Category 1 hurricane.
 September 16
 0600 UTC (2:00 a.m.
 1800 UTC (2:00 p.m. AST) – Hurricane Maria weakens to a tropical storm.
 1830 UTC (2:30 p.m. AST) – Tropical Storm Maria makes landfall near Cape St. Mary's, Newfoundland, with winds of 
 2100 UTC (5:00 p.m. AST) – Tropical Storm Maria dissipates over Newfoundland.
 September 20
 1800 UTC (2:00 p.m.
September 21
 0000 UTC (8:00 p.m. AST September 20) – Tropical Depression Sixteen intensifies into Tropical Storm Ophelia.
September 24
 0600 UTC (2:00 a.m.
 1200 UTC (8:00 a.m. AST) – Tropical Depression Seventeen intensifies into Tropical Storm Philippe.

September 25
 1200 UTC (8:00 a.m.
September 27
 1200 UTC (8:00 a.m.
September 28
 0000 UTC (8:00 p.m.
 0600 UTC (2:00 a.m.
 1200 UTC (8:00 a.m. AST) – Tropical Depression Philippe re-intensifies into a tropical storm.
September 29
 1800 UTC (2:00 p.m.
September 30
 0600 UTC (2:00 a.m. AST) – Hurricane Ophelia intensifies into a Category 2 hurricane.
 1800 UTC (2:00 p.m. AST) – Hurricane Ophelia intensifies into a Category 3 hurricane roughly midway between the Leeward Islands and Bermuda.

October
October 2
 0000 UTC (8:00 p.m.
 0600 UTC (2:00 a.m. AST) – Hurricane Ophelia weakens to a Category 3 hurricane.
 1200 UTC (8:00 a.m. AST) – Hurricane Ophelia weakens to a Category 2 hurricane.
October 3

 0000 UTC (8:00 p.m. AST October 2) – Hurricane Ophelia weakens to a Category 1 hurricane.
 0600 UTC (2:00 a.m.
 1000 UTC (6:00 a.m. AST) – Tropical Storm Ophelia transitions into an extratropical cyclone south of Newfoundland.
October 4
 0000 UTC (8:00 p.m.
 1200 UTC (8:00 a.m. AST) – Hurricane Philippe weakens to a tropical storm.
October 6
 0600 UTC (2:00 a.m.
October 7
 0000 UTC (8:00 p.m.
October 8
 0600 UTC (2:00 a.m. AST) – Hurricane Philippe weakens to a tropical storm.
 1800 UTC (2:00 p.m. AST) – Tropical Storm Philippe transitions into an extratropical cyclone.
October 23
 0600 UTC (2:00 a.m.
October 24
 0000 UTC (8:00 a.m. EDT) – Tropical Depression Eighteen intensifies into Tropical Storm Rina.

 1800 UTC (2:00 p.m. EDT) – Tropical Storm Rina intensifies into a Category 1 hurricane.
October 25
 0600 UTC (2:00 a.m. EDT) – Hurricane Rina intensifies into a Category 2 hurricane.
 1800 UTC (2:00 p.m. EDT) – Hurricane Rina intensifies into a Category 3 hurricane.
October 26
 0000 UTC (7:00 p.m.
 1200 UTC (7:00 a.m. CDT) – Hurricane Rina weakens to a Category 2 hurricane.
 1800 UTC (1:00 p.m. CDT) – Hurricane Rina weakens to a Category 1 hurricane.
October 27
 1200 UTC (7:00 a.m.
October 28
 0200 UTC (9:00 p.m.
 1800 UTC (1:00 p.m. CDT) – Tropical Storm Rina degenerates into a non-convective remnant area of low pressure south of Cuba.

November

November 8
 0600 UTC (1:00 a.m.
 1800 UTC (1:00 p.m. AST) – Subtropical Storm Sean transitions into a fully tropical storm.
November 12
 0000 UTC (7:00 p.m. AST November 11) – Tropical Storm Sean transitions into an extratropical cyclone southeast of Newfoundland.
November 30
The 2011 Atlantic hurricane season officially ends.

See also

Lists of Atlantic hurricanes
Timeline of the 2011 Pacific hurricane season

Notes

References

External links

 2011 Tropical Cyclone Advisory Archive, National Hurricane Center and Central Pacific Hurricane Center
 Hurricanes and Tropical Storms – Annual 2011, National Centers for Environmental Information

2011 Atlantic hurricane season
Articles which contain graphical timelines
2011 Atl T